William Herman Weaver (born November 17, 1948), nicknamed "Thunderfoot", is a former American football punter.  He played 11 seasons in the National Football League (NFL) from 1970 to 1980.  He spent his first seven years punting for the Detroit Lions and the last four years with the Seattle Seahawks. During his career, Weaver punted 693 times for 27,897 total yards. In 1975, Weaver was named the NFC Punter of the Year and in 1988 The Sporting News called him “One of the Top 20 Punters of all Time”. Weaver shares the all-time NFL record for having the most punts blocked in a career with 14.

Weaver played college football for the University of Tennessee Volunteers. While at Tennessee, he had a punt of 71 yards. He also had the best hang-time ever of 5.7 seconds.

"Thunderfoot"
The Detroit Lions were preparing for their game on Monday Night Football, Weaver stepped back to punt as the special teams took the field. Howard Cosell was watching practice and at the highest point of the ball flight, a blast of thunder let out of the sky. The next night on Monday Night Football, Cosell referred to Weaver as "Thunderfoot".

Career statistics
Regular season

|-
| style="text-align:center;"| 1970
| style="text-align:center;"| Detroit 
| 14 || 62 ||2,483 || 40.0 || || 65 || 1
|-
| style="text-align:center;"| 1971
| style="text-align:center;"| Detroit
| 13 || 42 ||1,752 || 41.7 || || 63 || style="background:#cfecec;"|2 
|-
| style="text-align:center;"| 1972
| style="text-align:center;"| Detroit
| 14 || 43 || 1,734 || 40.3 || || 55 || 0
|-
| style="text-align:center;"| 1973
| style="text-align:center;"| Detroit
| 14 || 54 || 2,333 || 43.2 || || 66 || 1
|-
| style="text-align:center;"| 1974
| style="text-align:center;"| Detroit
| 14 || 72 || 2,772 || 38.5 || || 61 || style="background:#cfecec;"|2 
|-
| style="text-align:center;"| 1975 
| style="text-align:center;"| Detroit
| 14 || 80 || 3,361 || 42.0 || || 61 || 1
|-
| style="text-align:center;"| 1976
| style="text-align:center;"| Detroit
| 14 || 83 || 3,280 || 39.5 || || 69 || 1
|-
| style="text-align:center;"| 1977
| style="text-align:center;"| Seattle
| 13 || 58 || 2,293 || 39.5 || || 59 || 1
|-
| style="text-align:center;"| 1978
| style="text-align:center;"| Seattle
| 16 || 66 || 2,440 || 37.0 || || 59 || 0
|-
| style="text-align:center;"| 1979
| style="text-align:center;"| Seattle
| 16 || 66 || 2,651 || 40.2 || || 60 || style="background:#cfecec;"|3 
|-
| style="text-align:center;"| 1980
| style="text-align:center;"| Seattle
| 16 || 67 || 2,798 || 41.8 || || 69 || style="background:#cfecec;"|2 
|-
|- class="sortbottom" style="background:#eee;"
|style="text-align:center;" colspan="2"|Career
| 158 || 693 || 27,897 || 40.3 || || 69 || style="background:#e0cef2;"|14
|}

Honors
NFC Punter of the Year, 1975
"One of the top 20 punters of all time," Sporting News, 1988

References

1948 births
Living people
People from Villa Rica, Georgia
Sportspeople from the Atlanta metropolitan area
Players of American football from Georgia (U.S. state)
American football punters
Tennessee Volunteers football players
Detroit Lions players
Seattle Seahawks players